The University of Valencia (also known as UV) is a public research university located in the city of Valencia, Spain. It is one of the oldest surviving universities in Spain, and the oldest in the Valencian Community. It is regarded as one of Spain's leading academic institutions.

The university was founded in 1499, and currently has around 55,000 students. Most of the courses are given through the medium of Spanish, but the university has promised to increase the number of courses available in Valencian. Moreover, in some degrees part of the teaching is in English.

It is located in the Mediterranean Spanish baseline, in the city of Valencia which is the capital and most populous city of the autonomous community of Valencia and the third largest city in Spain, with a population of 829,705 in 2014. One of its campuses is located in the metropolitan area of Valencia, in the municipalities of Burjassot and Paterna.

The current chancellor is María Vicenta Mestre Escrivá.

History
At the request of James I the Conqueror, Pope Innocent IV in 1246 authorized (by a Bull) the establishment of estudis generals in Valencia. The University Statutes were passed by the municipal magistrates of Valencia on April 30, 1499; this is considered to be the 'founding' of the university. In 1501, Pope Alexander VI signed the bill of approval and one year later Ferdinand II the Catholic proclaimed the Royal Mandatory Concession.

Its foundation was due to the zeal of St. Vincent Ferrer and to the donation of a building by Mosen Pedro Vilaragut. Only very meagre accounts have been preserved of the practical workings of the university. From the time of its foundation the courses included Latin, Greek, Hebrew, Arabic, philosophy, mathematics, and physics, theology, Canon law, and medicine.

The closing years of the seventeenth, and the whole of the eighteenth century, witnessed the most prosperous era of the university, Greek, Latin, mathematics, and medicine being specially cultivated. Among the names of illustrious students that of Tosca, Evangelista Torricelli's friend, noted physicist and author of important mathematical works, stands out prominently. Escolano says that it was the leading university in mathematics, the humanities, philosophy, and medicine. Large anatomical drawings were made by the students. Valencia was the first university of Spain to found a course for the study of herbs. Many of the Valencian graduates of medicine became famous. Pedro Ximeno discovered the third small bone of the ear. He was professor at Alcalá and had for a pupil the celebrated Vallés. Luis Collado, professor of botany, made some valuable discoveries and carried on exhaustive studies of the plants of the Levant; Vicente Alfonso Lorente wrote works on botany; and the famous botanist Cavanilles was also a student of this university.

In the seventeenth century, the university divided into two factions, the Thomists and the anti-Thomists. The discussions were heated and aroused partisan feelings throughout the entire Kingdom of Valencia. The university possessed a library of 27,000 volumes which was destroyed by the soldiers under the command of General Suchet. Among the most noted professors of the university was D. Francisco Pérez Bayer, a man of wide culture and great influence in the reign of Charles III of Spain. Around the university several colleges for poor students sprang up: the first was founded by St. Thomas of Villanova in 1561 and then followed those founded by Doña Angela Alonsar, and Mosen Pedro Martín. The most famous, called Corpus Christi, was founded by Blessed Juan de Ribera; Philip II founded that of San Jorge; and Melchor de Villena founded the last in 1643. During the Spanish Civil War, in 1938, a fire badly damaged the library.

Nowadays, it is a modern European public university open to almost every branch of teaching, research and learning in humanities, basic sciences and technology, health sciences, social sciences, and education.

Campuses 

The University of Valencia has three main urban campuses located in Valencia city and in Burjassot-Paterna, and some other buildings and facilities in the hearth of Valencia town, such as the Historic Building, Botanical Garden, Cerveró Palace, the Rectorate and others, and the astronomical observatory, located in the town of Aras de los Olmos.
	
The Burjassot Campus houses the colleges of Biology, Pharmacy, Physics, Chemistry, Mathematics and the School of Engineering.
On the Avenida de Blasco Ibañez Campus the Schools of Medicine and Dentistry, Philosophy and Educational Sciences, Psychology, Geography and History, Languages, Physical Education, Physiotherapy and Nursing.
The third campus, Tarongers, houses the Schools of Law, Economics and Business, Social Sciences, and recently the School of Elementary Teacher Training, which moved from its previous location near the Blasco Ibañez Campus.

Schools and Faculties

The University of Valencia has 18 Schools and Faculties located in its three main campuses. Each one allocates different academic departments and offers undergraduate, official masters and PhD programs.

Studying at the University of Valencia
The University of Valencia offers degrees in almost all of the academic fields: arts and humanities, engineering, health sciences, sciences, and social sciences.

The exchange programs with foreign universities, as well as other programs of International Cooperation and Development Aid, allow students to study in other academic institutions from Europe, North America, Latin America, and Asia. Regarding student mobility through Erasmus program, it is among the top ten universities in Europe. The university has partnered with International Studies Abroad, a study abroad provider based in Austin, Texas, to bring inbound students from the United States and Canada.

Research
Research is conducted through several ways. The Academic Departments within each School, the Research Institutes, the Science Park and some others.

The Research Institutes are conceived as multi-disciplinary research structures beyond the framework of the departments; they aim to meet the demand of the economic and social context in the research and transfer fields.

Notable faculty
 Juan José Martí (1570-1604) - novelist and canon lawyer
 Santiago Ramón y Cajal (1852-1934) - received Nobel Prize in Physiology or Medicine in 1906
 Dámaso Alonso (1898-1990) - poet, philologist, literary critic
 Ernest Lluch (1937-2000) - economist and politician
 Álvaro López-García (1941-2019) - astronomer
 Carles Solà (born 1945) - chemist and academic adminisrator
 Josep Guia (born 1947) - mathematician
 Jon Juaristi (born 1951) - poet, essayist and translator

Notable alumni

Arts and Science

 Juan Luis Vives (1493-1540) - Renaissance scholar; father of modern psychology
 Joseph Calasanz (1557-1648) - priest
 Juan Tomás de Rocaberti (1627-1699) - theologian
 Mathieu Orfila (1787-1853) - toxicologist, founder of science of toxicology
 Graciano López Jaena (1856-1896) - Filipino journalist
 José Martínez Ruiz (1873-1967) - novelist and literary critic
 José Gaos (1900-1969) - philosopher
 Isabel-Clara Simó (1943-2020) - journalist
 Rafael Ninyoles i Monllor (1943-2019) - sociolinguist
 José Luis Soberanes (born 1950) - Mexican lawyer
 Josep Carles Laínez (born 1970) - philologist
 Carlos Alós-Ferrer, economist
 Etelvina Andreu, physicist, medical doctor, politician
 José-Miguel Bernardo, mathematician, statistician
 Marti Bonmati Luis, medical doctor
 Estrella Durá, psychologist, politician
 María Ángeles Durán, sociologist
 Pablo Jarillo-Herrero, physicist
 Andrés Piquer, physician, philosopher
 Antoni Roig Muntaner, chemist
 Manuel Sánchez Ayuso, economist, politician
 Daniel Tordera, chemist
 Hassan Ugail, mathematician
 Antonio Vidal-Puig, medical doctor and scientist

Politics
 Gabriela Bravo, politician
 Gema Climent, scientist, tech entrepreneur
 Esther Herranz García (born 1969), politician
 Belén Hoyo Juliá, politician
 Joan Lerma, politician
 Enrique Monsonís, politician
 María Sornosa Martinez (born 1949), politician
 José Manuel Vela Bargues (1962–2022), economist and politician

Ranking

See also
 Vives Network
 List of medieval universities
 Route of the Borgias

Notes

References

External links

  

 
1499 establishments in Spain
Educational institutions established in the 15th century
Public universities
Route of the Borgias
Schools in Valencia
Universities and colleges in Spain